James Wyllie (15 October 1927 – 27 June 1992) was a Scottish footballer who played in the Scottish league for Kilmarnock, and made English football league appearances with Southport and Wrexham.

Career
Wyllie started out his professional career with Kilmarnock, however only made one appearance for the club in the 1949–1950 season.

He would then move to Southport on a free transfer. He made 15 appearances for the Merseyside-based club.

His performances earned him a move to Wrexham in December 1950, the club paying a four-figure fee for Wyllie. However, he would only make 20 appearances there before moving to Kidderminster Harriers.

Death
Wyllie died in Southport on 27 June 1992.

References

1927 births
1992 deaths
Scottish footballers
Association football inside forwards
Kilmarnock F.C. players
Southport F.C. players
Wrexham A.F.C. players
Kidderminster Harriers F.C. players
People from Saltcoats
Scottish Football League players
English Football League players